Kolender v. Lawson, 461 U.S. 352 (1983), is a United States Supreme Court case concerning the constitutionality of vague laws that allow police to demand that "loiterers" and "wanderers" provide "credible and reliable" identification.

Background 
Edward Lawson was a law-abiding black man with suitable knowledge of the U.S. Constitution. Lawson was frequently subjected to police questioning and harassment in San Diego County, California, where he lived when as a pedestrian he walked in so-called "white neighborhoods". He was detained or arrested approximately 15 times by the San Diego Police within 18 months, was prosecuted twice, and was convicted once (the second charge was dismissed).

Lawson challenged California Penal Code § 647(e),
which required persons who loiter or wander on the streets to identify themselves and account for their presence when requested by a peace officer to do so.
A California appellate court, in People v. Solomon  (1973), 33 Cal. App.3d 429, had construed the law to require "credible and reliable" identification that carries a "reasonable assurance" of its authenticity.

William Kolender was an appellant who was acting in his capacity as Chief of Police of San Diego, as was John Duffy who was acting in his capacity as Sheriff of San Diego County.

Prior history 
The Ninth Circuit, in Lawson v. Kolender, 658 F.2d 1362 (1981), had additionally held that Penal Code §647(e) violated the Fourth Amendment’s prohibition of unreasonable searches and seizures because it "subverts the probable cause requirement" by authorizing arrest for conduct that is no more than suspicious. "Vagrancy statutes cannot turn otherwise innocent conduct into a crime". Id. at 1367.

The Ninth Circuit also noted that "police knowledge of the identity of an individual they have deemed 'suspicious' grants the police unfettered discretion to initiate or continue the investigation of the person long after the detention has ended. Information concerning the stop, the arrest and the individual's identity may become part of a large scale data bank." Id. at 1368.

Lawson represented himself up through the conclusion of the Federal Ninth Circuit Court appeal. He was told he could not represent himself before the Supreme Court without a law degree, so he had an ACLU lawyer represent him before the Court.

Conclusion 
Using the construction of the California appellate court in Solomon, the Court held that the law was unconstitutionally vague because it gave excessive discretion to the police (in the absence of probable cause to arrest) whether to stop and interrogate a suspect or leave him alone.
The Court hinted that the California statute compromised the constitutional right to freedom of movement.

Because the U.S. Supreme Court was able to resolve Kolender on the issue of vagueness, they did not decide the Fourth Amendment issue.

Subsequent history
Kolender was cited in Hiibel v. Sixth Judicial District Court of Nevada, as an example of a "stop and identify" statute the Court had voided on vagueness grounds. In Hiibel, the Court held that a Nevada law
requiring persons detained upon reasonable suspicion of involvement in a crime to state their name to a peace officer did not violate the Fourth Amendment's prohibition of unreasonable searches and seizures. Unlike California Penal Code §647(e) as construed in Solomon, the Nevada statute was apparently interpreted by the Nevada Supreme Court as requiring only that persons detained upon involvement in a crime to state their name.

Hiibel does not provide a means of arresting someone for failing or refusing to identify himself. [See People v. Fernandez, 2011 IL App (2d) 100473]

California Penal Code §647(e) was repealed in 2008 at the request of the Los Angeles County Sheriff's Department.

See also
 List of United States Supreme Court cases, volume 461
 Papachristou v. Jacksonville, 405 U.S. 156 (1972)
 Vagueness doctrine

Notes

References

Further reading

External links
Edward C. Lawson 

United States Supreme Court cases
Void for vagueness case law
1983 in United States case law
Legal history of California
History of San Diego
United States Supreme Court cases of the Burger Court
Vagrancy laws